Kannamoochi Yenada? is a 2007 Indian Tamil-language romantic comedy film written and directed by V. Priya.  The film stars Prithviraj, Sandhya, Sathyaraj and Raadhika Sarathkumar and Sripriya, Radha Ravi and Manobala in supporting roles. The film's score and soundtrack is composed by Yuvan Shankar Raja. The film, a remake of the 2005 American film Guess Who, which is itself a remake of the 1967 American film Guess Who's Coming to Dinner, was jointly produced and distributed by Raadan Media Works, UTV, and Pyramid Saimira. The music was composed by Yuvan Shankar Raja with cinematography by Preetha Jayaraman and editing by Sathish Suriya. It released on 8 November 2007 during Deepavali. The film's title was inspired from a song from Kandukondain Kandukondain.

Plot
Harish Venkatraman (Prithviraj), a software architect by profession who lives in Malaysia, is the millionaire nephew of Maheswaran Iyer (Radha Ravi). Having lost his parents early in life, he runs his uncle's business with impressive results. He stumbles upon the psychiatry student Devasena (Sandhya) in the most cinematic manner and falls for her that very instant. Deva is the daughter of Commissioner Arumugam Gounder (Sathyaraj) and Dhamayanthi (Raadhika) in Chennai. As the plot progresses, Deva is being summoned by her parents for their silver jubilee wedding anniversary back home. Notwithstanding the fact he has a flourishing business to attend to and much to the wrath of his uncle (who arranges for his wedding with his business partner's daughter), Harish takes the next flight to Chennai to accompany Deva. He is subjected to a warm welcome by Dhamayanthi and a cold shoulder by Arumugam. To make matters worse, Maheswaran's vicious character assassination (in the name of a complaint he sends to the police commissioner's office) does not help Harish in the task of gaining enough confidence among his girlfriend's parents. Will Harish win his love back, now that his chance of impressing Deva's parents are doomed?

Cast
Prithviraj as Harish Venkatraman
Sandhya as Devasena Arumugam Gounder
Sathyaraj as Commissioner Arumugam Gounder
Raadhika Sarathkumar as Dhamayanthi Arumugam Gounder
Sripriya as Seetha
Radha Ravi as Maheswaran Iyer
Manobala as Senthilkannu
Sundaram as Arumugam Gounder's father
Mahanadhi Shankar as Vellaichamy (cameo appearance)
Mayilsamy (cameo appearance)

Soundtrack

The music was scored by Yuvan Shankar Raja, teaming up with director V. Priya again after Kanda Naal Mudhal (2005). The soundtrack was released on 23 August 2007 by Vivek Oberoi. It features 5 tracks, including a retune of the yesteryear hit song "Andru Vandhadhum" from the M. G. R.-starrer Periya Idathu Penn, being just the second song to be retuned after A. R. Rahman's "Thottal Poo Malarum" from the film New. Noticeably, singer Shankar Mahadevan lent his voice for three songs. Lyrics were provided by Thamarai.

Yuvan Shankar Raja won accolades for creating an "interesting" and "thoroughly enjoyable" album, which was cited to be "an absolute treat to listen to". Behindwoods, which described the song "Kannamoochi" as "this year’s one of the most enjoyable songs" and the song "Sanjaram" as a "masterpiece", said, that the Yuvan-Priya duo had even bettered their previous venture Kanda Naal Mudhal, giving the album four out of five stars.

Critical reception
Sify wrote "On the whole, the first half wins you over with its simple charm, its immensely likeable characters, and the intrinsic humour in the writing. But the latter half is too long, contrived and predictable to the extent of being seriously boring. In the final analysis, however, these are a few wrong turns in an otherwise entertaining film that'll bring a smile to your face". Behindwoods wrote "To sum it all up, V. Priya's effort is noteworthy, if her first movie was like a morning cup of coffee for the youth, this time she serves well for the whole family".

References

External links
 

Indian remakes of American films
2007 films
2007 romantic comedy films
2000s Tamil-language films
UTV Motion Pictures films
Indian romantic comedy films